Spastic paraplegia 9 (autosomal dominant) is a protein that in humans is encoded by the SPG9 gene.

References

Further reading 

 

Proteins